Herbert Crossthwaite (4 April 1887 – 20 May 1944) was an English footballer who played as a goalkeeper.

Born in Preston, Lancashire, he began his football career as a youth with home-town club Preston North End. He went on to play one game in the Football League for Preston's arch-rivals Blackpool (at Gainsborough Trinity on 29 September 1906) and two for Fulham, and spent one-and-a-half seasons with Southern League club Exeter City, before joining Birmingham, for whom he played 49 league games. He later signed for Stoke, before retiring from the game in around 1915.

Crossthwaite remained an amateur throughout his football career. He joined the Birmingham City Police in 1910, rising to the rank of inspector. He died in Birmingham in 1944.

Crossthwaite's cousin, Harry Crossthwaite, played League football for Stockport County and Stoke.

References

1887 births
1944 deaths
Footballers from Preston, Lancashire
English footballers
Association football goalkeepers
Preston North End F.C. players
Blackpool F.C. players
Fulham F.C. players
Exeter City F.C. players
Birmingham City F.C. players
Stoke City F.C. players
English Football League players
Birmingham City Police